Qaleh Gardan may refer to:
 Qaleh Gardan, Gilan
 Qaleh Gardan, Mazandaran